Eugénie Honorée Marguerite Servières, née Charen (1786 – 20 March 1855) was a French painter in the Troubadour style.

In 1807 she married the playwright Joseph Servières and is generally known as Mme. de Servières. She trained with her stepfather, Guillaume Guillon-Lethière and specialized in genre period paintings. The Paris Salon awarded her medals in 1808 and 1817.

Her Mathilde makes Malek-Adhel promise to become a Christian (1812, from a novel about the Crusades by Sophie Cottin) was purchased by the Empress Marie Louise for her personal collection, while the evocative Inez de Castro and her Children at the feet of the King of Portugal is preserved at the Trianon Palace at Versailles, near Paris.

Notes

Further reading
 Germaine Greer, The Obstacle Race: The Fortunes of Women Painters and Their Work, Tauris (1979)

External links

Eugénie Servières on the Joconde database

French women painters
1786 births
1855 deaths
19th-century French painters
19th-century French women artists